Stanislav Senyk (born 23 November 1996 in Ivano-Frankivsk, Ukraine) is a male Ukrainian athlete specialising in the 400 metres and 800 metres. He won two gold medals at the 2019 European Games.

International competitions

Personal bests
Outdoor
 400 metres – 46.68 (Kropyvnytskiy 2018)
 800 metres – 1:48.06 (Kropyvnytskiy 2018)
Indoor
 300 metres – 35.59 (Lviv 2017)
 400 metres – 48.35 (Kyiv 2019)
 600 metres – 1:21.01 (Lviv 2017)
 800 metres – 1:51.15 (Kyiv 2016)

References

1996 births
Living people
Sportspeople from Ivano-Frankivsk
Ukrainian male sprinters
Athletes (track and field) at the 2019 European Games
European Games medalists in athletics
European Games gold medalists for Ukraine
20th-century Ukrainian people
21st-century Ukrainian people